Eritadenine is a chemical compound found in shiitake mushrooms. Eritadenine is an inhibitor of S-adenosyl-L-homocysteine hydrolase (SAHH) and has hypocholesterolemic activity.

Synthesis
The structure is a purine alkylated with an oxidized sugar fragment.

Ring opening of the protected lactone (1), derived from erythrose with sodium phthalimide gives the acid 2; hydrazinolysis (cf Gabriel synthesis) then leads to the amino acid 3. Displacement of chlorine in pyrimidine 4 by the amine function on 3 serves to attach the future imidazole nitrogen and the sugar-derived sidechain (5). The nitro group is then reduced by catalytic hydrogenation, the resulting primary amine is the most basic and is selectively formylated with formic acid. These strongly acidic conditions serve to remove the acetonide protecting group as well (6). Treatment with NaOH then serves to close the imidazole ring, forming eritadenine (7)

References

External links
 Structure and function of eritadenine and its 3-deaza analogues

Alkaloids
Carboxylic acids